Lorenza Vigarani (born 10 December 1969, in Bologna) is a retired backstroke swimmer from Italy, who represented her native country in three consecutive Summer Olympics, starting in 1988. She won her first international senior medal (silver) as a member of the women's 4×100 medley relay team at the 1987 European Championships (long course).

References
 RAI Profile

1969 births
Living people
Italian female swimmers
Swimmers at the 1988 Summer Olympics
Swimmers at the 1992 Summer Olympics
Swimmers at the 1996 Summer Olympics
Olympic swimmers of Italy
Sportspeople from Bologna
World Aquatics Championships medalists in swimming
European Aquatics Championships medalists in swimming
Mediterranean Games gold medalists for Italy
Swimmers at the 1987 Mediterranean Games
Swimmers at the 1991 Mediterranean Games
Mediterranean Games medalists in swimming